The Naples metropolitan area, or Greater Naples, is a metropolitan area in Campania, Italy, centered on the city of Naples.

Overview 
Naples urban area and metropolitan area is the second most populous in Italy, after Milan. According to European Spatial Planning Observation Network, in 2007 the Naples polycentric metropolitan area had a population of 3,714,000. More recent evaluations have put the population of the urban agglomeration encompassing Naples at between 3,700,000 and 5,000,000.

The SVIMEZ claims that the area has a population of 4,434,136 on area of 2300 km2. The CENSIS put the population at 4,996,000. According to the ONU in 2010 the metropolitan area has a population of 5,000,000

This makes the area the 5th-most populous urban area in the European Union.

Composition 
The Naples metropolitan area includes the whole metropolitan city of Naples, 35 municipalities in province of Caserta, 10 municipalities in province of Avellino and 34 municipalities in province of Salerno, in all 171 municipalities, Naples metropolitan area - SVIMEZ the most important of these by population are Salerno, Giugliano in Campania, Torre del Greco, Pozzuoli, Casoria e Caserta, as shows the next table. 
In reality the metro area is much bigger, but political agreements were made that left it as is currently, and the real estimated population is about 6.8 million.

Naples metropolitan area - SVIMEZ
(2) - :it:Area metropolitana di Napoli
(3) - ISTAT data 
(4) -  :es:Grande Napoli

References 

 
Metropolitan areas of Italy
Geography of Campania
Geography of the Metropolitan City of Naples
Province of Avellino
Province of Caserta
Province of Naples
Province of Salerno
Metropolitan City of Naples